Hedgpethia is a genus of sea spider, in the family Colossendeidae. The genus was named after the marine biologist and sea spider specialist Joel Hedgpeth.

It includes the following species :

Hedgpethia articulata Loman, 1908 — Flores Sea
Hedgpethia atlantica (Stock, 1970) — Josephine Bank, Northwest Africa
Hedgpethia bicornis Losina-Losinsky and Turpaeva, 1958 — Pacific Ocean: southeast of Kuril Islands, Okhotsk Sea
Hedgpethia brevitarsis Losina-Losinsky and Turpaeva, 1958 — Okhotsk Sea
Hedgpethia californica Hedgpeth, 1939 — Pacific Ocean: South California (in green mud)
Hedgpethia caudata Turpaeva, 1993 — Pacific Ocean, 3,000 m deep
Hedgpethia chitinosa Hilton, 1943 — Pacific Ocean: California coast
Hedgpethia dampieri Child, 1975 — Indian Ocean: west of Lancelin Island, Australia
Hedgpethia dofleini Loman, 1911 — Pacific Ocean: Misaki, Sagami Bay, Japan
Hedgpethia magnirostris Arnaud and Child, 1988 — Indian Ocean: Zululand area, South Africa
Hedgpethia nasica Child, 1994 — Pacific Ocean: west of Point Arguelo, California (on otter trawl)
Hedgpethia tibialis Stock, 1991 — New Caledonia

References

 PycnoBase: Taxon tree

Pycnogonids
Chelicerate genera